Jeffrey L. Gangwisch (born 1985 in Philadelphia, Pennsylvania) is a filmmaker, photographer and Fulbright Scholar. He attended University of New Orleans, where he studied film production and fine art, and University College Falmouth in the UK, where he studied television production.

He is the founder of the CineNovus Media Company and was the first Fulbright Scholar to be assigned to Cornwall, England.

Projects include Radio and SouthWest End.

References

External links 
 
 
 CineNovus Media Company official web page

1985 births
Living people
Artists from Philadelphia
American film directors
American photographers